Nettenchelys is a genus of eels in the duckbill eel family Nettastomatidae.

Species
There are currently 10 recognized species in this genus:
 Nettenchelys bellottii (D'Ancona, 1928) 
 Nettenchelys dionisi Brito, 1989
 Nettenchelys erroriensis Karmovskaya, 1994
 Nettenchelys exoria J. E. Böhlke & D. G. Smith, 1981
 Nettenchelys gephyra Castle & D. G. Smith, 1981 (Bridge duckbill eel)
 Nettenchelys inion D. G. Smith & J. E. Böhlke, 1981
 Nettenchelys paxtoni Karmovskaya, 1999
 Nettenchelys proxima D. G. Smith, J. Lin & H. M. Chen, 2015 
 Nettenchelys pygmaea D. G. Smith & J. E. Böhlke, 1981 (Pygmy duckbill eel)
 Nettenchelys taylori Alcock, 1898

References

Nettastomatidae